Gladys Porter Early College High School is a 5A public high school in Brownsville, Texas (USA) and is one of the successors of "Brownsville High School". It is one of six high schools operated by the Brownsville Independent School District. In 2015, the school was rated "Met Standard" by the Texas Education Agency.

History 
Porter High School was built to alleviate the over-crowded conditions which had existed at Brownsville High School for three years. Before the construction began, the school's colors and mascot were chosen at a board meeting on October 2, 1973. The school was named for Gladys Sams Porter (1910-March 16, 1980), the daughter of Earl C. Sams, who was the first president of the J.C. Penney retail chain and Lula A. Sams. Porter was a  Brownsville civic leader and philanthropist. The school is a magnet school for Technology and Engineering. The first principal was Tony Ortiz. The Magnet Program from Porter High School will be moved to Veterans Memorial High School for the 2012-2013 school year.

Athletics
The Porter Cowboys compete in the following sports:
 
Baseball
Basketball
Cross Country
Football
Golf
Powerlifting
Soccer
Softball
Swimming and Diving
Tennis
Track and Field
Volleyball

Soccer
Boys Soccer 
2006(5A) State Champions
2016(5A) State Champions

References

External links
 

Education in Brownsville, Texas
Brownsville Independent School District high schools
1969 establishments in Texas